Englewood station is a RTD light rail station in Englewood, Colorado, United States. Operating as part of the D Line, the station was opened on July 14, 2000, and is operated by the Regional Transportation District. It serves the Englewood City Center, site of the former Cinderella City Mall.

References

External links

RTD light rail stations
Englewood, Colorado
Railway stations in the United States opened in 2000
Transportation buildings and structures in Arapahoe County, Colorado